The Association of Software Professionals (ASP), formerly Association of Shareware Professionals, was a professional association for authors and developers of freeware, commercial, and shareware computer software. It was formed in April 1987, and for a time, it was considered as the most popular trade organization for independent software developers and vendors.

The ASP developed and maintain the Portable Application Description (PAD) format used to allow software authors to provide product descriptions and specifications to online sources in a standard way. As of 2021, the PAD file specification was utilized by over 40,000 software publishers and a 1000+ PAD supported software catalog websites. The PAD system is popular because web sites can pull updated data from a single file stored on the software author's site. The final release of the PAD specification, v4.0 was released to the public domain as of January 2022. 

The ASP also played a role in making FILE_ID.DIZ files a de facto standard.

In 2011, the ASP purchased the rights to the Software Industry Conference from the Software Industry Awards Foundation. The conference was renamed ISVCon.

After a 34-year run, the ASP ceased operations on December 31, 2021, following a membership decision to dissolve the organization.

References

External links
 

Businesspeople in software
Technology trade associations